Quiet as It's Kept is an album by American jazz drummer Max Roach featuring tracks recorded in 1959 and released on the Mercury label.

Reception

In his review for Allmusic, Michael G. Nastos stated, "this 1960 band, with the brothers Tommy and Stanley Turrentine, and Julian Priester, was short-lived, very satisfying, and one of the most memorable combos the drummer led. Continuing to concentrate on hard bop themes, the band is hardly quiet as the title would suggest. It perhaps could be said that this band was a sleeper in not being as recognized as the superior collective talent would indicate".

Track listing
 "Quiet as It's Kept" (Bill Lee) - 6:12     
 "To Lady" (Leon Mitchell) - 6:08     
 "Lotus Blossom" (Kenny Dorham) - 5:34     
 "As Long as You're Living" (Julian Priester, Tommy Turrentine) - 5:58     
 "The More I See You" (Mack Gordon, Harry Warren) - 4:04     
 "Juliano" (Priester) - 5:40

Personnel 
Max Roach - drums
Tommy Turrentine - trumpet
Julian Priester - trombone
Stanley Turrentine  - tenor saxophone
Bob Boswell  - bass

References 

1959 albums
Max Roach albums
Mercury Records albums